Evgenia Borisovna Kosigina (born 20 March 1995) is a Russian former competitive ice dancer. With Nikolai Moroshkin, she won six medals on the ISU Junior Grand Prix series and finished in the top ten at three World Junior Championships.

Career 
Kosigina began skating to improve her health and took up ice dancing when she was eight. She competed in novice ice dance with Anatoli Kolisgo and later skated with Sergei Mozgov, with whom she debuted on the Junior Grand Prix. Her partner left her after the 2009–10 season.

Kosigina began skating with Nikolai Moroshkin in June 2010, coached by Alexei Gorshkov in Kosigina's hometown of Odintsovo, near Moscow. During the 2010–11 season, Kosigina/Moroshkin won bronze at their first JGP event, in Courchevel, France. At their second event, in Dresden, Germany, they won a gold medal. These medals qualified them for the Junior Grand Prix Final, where they finished sixth. At the 2011 Russian Junior Championships, Kosigina/Moroshkin won the bronze medal and then placed sixth at the 2011 World Junior Championships.

Kosigina/Moroshkin competed in the 2011–12 Junior Grand Prix, winning silver in Latvia and bronze in Estonia. They finished fifth at the 2012 Russian Junior Championships and were not assigned to Junior Worlds.

Kosigina/Moroshkin received additional coaching from Igor Shpilband in preparation for the 2012–13 season. They won a pair of silver medals at their events in Lake Placid, New York and Zagreb, Croatia, and finished sixth at the JGP Final in Sochi, Russia. They then won silver at the 2013 Russian Junior Championships and finished sixth at the 2013 World Junior Championships.

Kosigina/Moroshkin finished fourth at the 2014 Russian Junior Championships. Initially first alternates, they joined the Russian team to the 2014 World Junior Championships after Alexandra Stepanova / Ivan Bukin withdrew.

Programs 
(with Moroshkin)

Competitive highlights 
CS: Challenger Series; JGP: Junior Grand Prix

With Moroshkin

With Mozgov

References

External links 

 
 

Russian female ice dancers
1995 births
Living people
People from Odintsovo
Competitors at the 2015 Winter Universiade